Robsonodendron maritimum (also known as white silky bark or witsybas) is a small, shrubby, evergreen tree that is indigenous to the coastal regions of South Africa.

Its natural range extends from Cape Town, along the coast as far as the Eastern Cape. In very windy areas it tends to be shaped (and effectively pruned) by the wind. Its flowers are bisexual.

References

Further reading
 Van Wyk: Field Guide to Trees of Southern Africa, Struik, 1997.

Celastraceae
Flora of South Africa
Trees of South Africa